Spaniopsis is a genus of snipe flies of the family Rhagionidae. They are very stout bodied flies from 3 to 6 mm, with generally grey or dark grey thorax, and are only known from Australia.

Species
Spaniopsis clelandi Ferguson, 1915
Spaniopsis longicornis Ferguson, 1915
Spaniopsis mackerrasi (Paramonov, 1962)
Spaniopsis marginipennis Ferguson, 1915
Spaniopsis rieki (Paramonov, 1962)
Spaniopsis tabaniformis White, 1914
Spaniopsis vexans Ferguson, 1915

References

Rhagionidae
Brachycera genera
Diptera of Australasia